The 2001–02 Drexel Dragons men's basketball team represented Drexel University  during the 2001–02 NCAA Division I men's basketball season. The Dragons, led by 1st year head coach Bruiser Flint, played their home games at the Daskalakis Athletic Center and were members of the Colonial Athletic Association (CAA).

The team finished the season 14–14, and finished in 4th place in the CAA in the regular season.

Roster

Schedule

|-
!colspan=9 style="background:#F8B800; color:#002663;"| Regular season
|-

|-
!colspan=9 style="background:#F8B800; color:#002663;"| CAA Regular season
|-

|-
!colspan=9 style="background:#F5CF47; color:#002663;"| CAA tournament

Awards
Bruiser Flint
CAA Coach Of The Year

Robert Battle
CAA All-Conference First Team
CAA Defensive Player of the Year
CAA All-Defensive Team

Phil Goss
CAA All-Rookie Team

Eric Schmieder
CAA Player of the Week

Tim Whitworth
CAA Player of the Week

References

Drexel Dragons men's basketball seasons
Drexel
2001 in sports in Pennsylvania
2002 in sports in Pennsylvania